Aalippazhangal is a 1987 Indian Malayalam film, directed by Ramachandran Pillai and produced by Geodaya. The film stars Sukumari, Thilakan, Jose Prakash and Sankaradi in the lead roles. The film has musical score by Darsan Raman.

Cast
Sukumari
Thilakan
Jose Prakash
Sankaradi
Shankar
Jagannatha Varma
KPAC Sunny
Ragini
Girly

Soundtrack
The music was composed by Darsan Raman and the lyrics were written by Mariamma Philip.

References

External links
 

1987 films
1980s Malayalam-language films